Richard Beynon may refer to:

 Bynon, British-Canadian music producer and DJ
 Richard Beynon (writer) (1925–1999), Australian-born playwright, actor and television producer